Petleshkov Hill (‘Petleshkov Halm’ \pet-'lesh-kov 'h&lm\) is the ice-covered hill rising to 221 m in northwestern Astrolabe Island in Bransfield Strait, Antarctica. It surmounts Mokren Bight to the south.

The feature is “named after Vasil Petleshkov (1845-1876), a leader of the 1876 April Uprising for Bulgarian independence, in connection with the settlement of Petleshkovo in Northeastern Bulgaria.”

Location
German-British mapping in 1996.

Maps
 Trinity Peninsula. Scale 1:250000 topographic map No. 5697. Institut für Angewandte Geodäsie and British Antarctic Survey, 1996.
 Antarctic Digital Database (ADD). Scale 1:250000 topographic map of Antarctica. Scientific Committee on Antarctic Research (SCAR). Since 1993, regularly upgraded and updated.

Notes

References
 Petleshkov Hill. SCAR Composite Gazetteer of Antarctica.
 Bulgarian Antarctic Gazetteer. Antarctic Place-names Commission. (details in Bulgarian, basic data in English)

External links
 Petleshkov Hill. Copernix satellite image

Hills of Trinity Peninsula
Astrolabe Island
Bulgaria and the Antarctic